The Girls are a new wave/punk pop band from Seattle, Washington that formed in the early 2000s. As of 2012, their members are lead vocalist/frontman Shannon Brown, guitarists Zache Davis and Vas Kumar, bassist Colin Griffiths, keyboardist Derek Mason, and drummer Elie Goral. Their sound has been compared to that of multiple '70's bands, including the Cars and the Voidoids.

History
The Girls released their self-titled debut album in 2004 on Dirtnap Records; soon afterward, the band fell apart, and every member left except Brown. In 2006, the band returned with Brown and an otherwise new lineup, and their second album, the Martin Feveyear-engineered Yes No Yes No Yes No, was released on Dirtnap Records in 2008. To promote the album, they performed at that year's Bumbershoot on August 30.

Name
Despite their name, the Girls' members are all men, which has led to some guests to their shows being surprised that they are not an all-female band. Of these guests, Brown has said, "Dudes like that come out of the woodwork for that all-girl shit."

Critical reception
Brian Howe of Pitchfork Media gave the Girls' self-titled debut album a 7.0 out of 10 rating. In his review, he wrote that the album was "no fishnet-hawking electroclash fashionista rock; besides having more sexxx appeal than both Coreys combined, The Girls've got chops like Ralph Macchio." OverDefined, writing for Punknews.org, gave Yes No Yes No Yes No a highly negative review, writing that the band "just sound like stylistic posturing and it does nothing for me" and giving the album 1 star out of 5.

Discography
The Girls (Dirtnap, 2004)
Yes No Yes No Yes No (Dirtnap, 2008)

References

Musical groups from Seattle
Pop punk groups from Washington (state)
American glam rock musical groups
Musical groups established in the 2000s
Dirtnap Records artists
American new wave musical groups